Mount Adelung (Adelunga Toghi) (4,301 m)
Mount Beshtor (Beshtar) (4,299 m)
Khazret Sultan (4,643 m), formerly Peak of the 22nd Congress of the Communist Party
Gissar Range
Pskem Range
Zeravshan Range
Talas Ala-Too Range
Chatkal Range
Ugam Range
Turkestan Range
Greater Chimgan (3,309)

Mountains of Uzbekistan
Mountain ranges of Uzbekistan
Uzbekistan
Uzbekistan